Vivo or VIVO may refer to:

Companies
 Vivo (technology company), a Chinese consumer electronics company
 Vivo (telecommunications company), a Brazilian mobile phone company
 Vivo Class, a British company that sells a web-based rewards system to schools
 Vivo Energy, a British downstream petroleum company
 Vivo Film, an Italian film production company
 Vivo Italian Kitchen, a restaurant at Universal Orlando Resort, Florida, US
 Vivo Software, an American streaming media company acquired by RealNetworks in 1988
 Vivo TV, a Brazilian pay television operator
 Vivo!, a retail-park brand of the Austrian real-estate company Immofinanz

Computing
 VIVO (software), a suite for managing scientific research information
 Video-in video-out (VIVO), a type of graphics port

Music
 Vivo (Coda album), 2006
 Vivo (Luis Miguel album), 2000
 Vivo (Ricardo Arjona album), 1999
 Vivo (Tanghetto album), 2011
 Vivo (Vico C album), 2001
 Vivo, an album by Clã, 2005
 "Vivo", a song by Andrea Bocelli from Sì, 2018
 "Vivo (Ti scrivo)", a song by Luca Barbarossa, representing Italy at the Eurovision Song Contest 1988

Other
 Vivo, Limpopo, a town in South Africa
 Vivo (film), a 2021 American animated film
 Vivo (photography), a 1957–1961 Japanese photographic cooperative

See also
 
 En Vivo (disambiguation)
 Ex vivo, refers to studies or experiments done outside an organism 
 In vivo, refers to studies or experiments done on living organisms